Allan Okello (born 4 July 2000) is a Ugandan footballer who plays for KCCA FC, on loan from Paradou AC and the Uganda national team as an attacking midfielder. He was the Fufa Airtel Footballer of the Year 2019.

KCCA FC
On  24 February 2017, Okello was unveiled at Kampala Capital City Authority's ground, Lugogo. Okello netted a hat trick and assisted one goal on his senior debut as Kampala Capital City Authority defeated Onduparaka FC 7–0 at Phillip Omondi stadium on 27 February 2017, thus becoming the first player to score a hat trick in the Uganda Premier League 2016–2017 season.
In July 2017, many professional clubs worldwide  such as  Mamelodi Sundowns, Amsterdamsche Football Club Ajax and Egyptian club Al Ahly Sporting Club showed interest in Okello. However, his agent, Isaac Mwesigwa confirmed that "he will not leave the country until he has completed his A-level studies".

2018–19 Uganda Premier League
Okello played his first game of the season on 28 September, against Soana FC at Phillip Omondi StarTimes Stadium, Kampala Capital City Authority (won 2–1). He scored his first goal of the season against Onduparaka on 19 October at Green Light Stadium, Arua. OKello played his last game of the season against Maroons FC on 4 May 2019, at Phillip Omondi StarTimes Stadium. He played over 24 matches in the season. Kampala Capital City Authority became the league champions. OKello completed the 2018–2019 Uganda Premier League season with six goals.

Paradou AC 
On 21 January 2020, Okello signed a 3-year contract with Paradou AC.

KCCA FC Return
On 20 September 2022, Okello signed a one-year loan contract with KCCA FC.

National Team

Uganda U20
Okello  played for  Uganda U20 during the COSAFA U-20 Tournament which was held in Zambia in 2017. He made his debut on 6 December 2017, against Zambia U20 when he  came in as a substitute replacing Pius Obuya at Arthur Davis Stadium, Kitwe.

Uganda U23
Okello has played for  Uganda U23 during the TOTAL AFCON U-23 Qualifiers. He made his debut on 14 November 2018, against South Sudan U23 at Star Times Stadium Lugogo, Uganda U23 won the game 1-0.

Uganda national football team
On 13 March 2019, Uganda head coach Sébastien Desabre  invited Okello to be on the final team preparing for the final 2019 Afcon qualifying game against Tanzania. However he made his senior national team debut against Somalia.

International goals
Scores and results list Uganda's goal tally first.

Personal life
Born and raised in the northern town of Lira, Okello found his way to Kampala to study at the football power house Kibuli S.S following the death of his biological mother in 2012. Okello was born to Patrick Ojom (deceased) and Joan Agomu.

Honors
Lira Destiny Sports Academy
 Winner – ARS Northern Region : 2014
Kibuli S.S
 Champions Copa Coca-Cola : 2016
 National Post Primary Championship :  2014

KCCA FC
Uganda Premier League :2 : 2016–2017, 2018–2019 
Uganda Cup : 2016–2017, 2017–2018

Individual
Football 256 Footballer oF The Year 2019.
Buzz Teeniez Awards Sports Personlity of the Year 2019
 Airtel Rising Stars M.V.P: 3 :2014, 2015, 2016
 Copa Coca-Cola M.V.P: 2016
 FUFA Junior League  M.V.P: 2016
 Young Player of the Year : 2016–2017
 Airtel FUFA Best eleven 2017–2018
Airtel FUFA fans’ favourite player of the year 2018
Airtel Fufa Footballer of the year 2019.

References

External links

newvision.co.ug
 monitor.co.ug
chimpreports.com
nimsportug.com
airtelfootball.ug
nilepost.co.ug

Ugandan footballers
2000 births
Living people
Kampala Capital City Authority FC players
People from Lira District
Association football midfielders
Uganda international footballers